Marek Maďarič (born 23 March 1966 in Bratislava) is a Slovak politician for the Direction - Social Democracy. He was between 4 April 2012 and 28 February 2018 Minister of Culture in Robert Fico's Second and Third Cabinets. Maďarič resigned as minister in the aftermath of the assassination of Ján Kuciak.

References

1966 births
Living people
Politicians from Bratislava
Direction – Social Democracy politicians
Culture ministers of Slovakia
Members of the National Council (Slovakia) 2016-2020